The Brain Bowl is the name given to the MIT–WPI football rivalry. It is an American college football rivalry game played annually between the MIT Engineers of Massachusetts Institute of Technology and the WPI Engineers of Worcester Polytechnic Institute. The two schools have been rivals in the academic and in the sports arena, but the rivalry was expanded to the sport of football when the New England Women's and Men's Athletic Conference (NEWMAC) began sponsoring the sport in 2017. Despite the two teams first meeting being in 1888, the programs have only faced each other sixteen times with an 89-year hiatus. With the two programs now competing in the same conference, they will now face each other regularly each year.

MIT beat WPI in double overtime in 2019.

Game results

See also  
 List of NCAA college football rivalry games

References

College football rivalries in the United States
MIT Engineers football
WPI Engineers football